Hemidactylus brookii, also known commonly as Brooke's house gecko and the spotted house gecko, is a widespread species of lizard in the family Gekkonidae.

Etymology
The specific name, brookii, is in honor of British adventurer James Brooke.

Description
Snout somewhat longer than the distance between the eye and the ear-opening, nearly twice the diameter of the orbit; forehead concave; ear-opening small, oval, vertical, about one third the diameter of the eye; on the occiput very small round tubercles. Rostral quadrangular, with a median cleft; nostril bordered by the rostral, the first upper labial and three nasals, the upper not in contact with its fellow. Eight to ten upper and seven to nine lower labials; mental large, triangular; two or three pair of chin-shields, median forming - a suture. Scales of the throat granular. Body covered with small granules, intermixed with large keeled trihedral tubercles, arranged in 16-20 longitudinal series, the keels of the outer ones indistinct; the diameter of the largest tubercles on the flanks exceeds the diameter of the ear-opening. Ventral scales larger 
than those on the throat, cycloid, imbricate. Male with 7-20 femoral pores on each side. Tail depressed, annulate, with rows of 8 or 6 spine-like tubercles, below with a series of transversely dilated plates. Limbs granular, the upper part of the hind limb with large keeled tubercles; digits free, dilated, the free distal joint long, 3-6 lamellae under the inner, 6-8 under the median toes.

Yellowish-brown above with irregular dark spots; one or two dark lines on the side of the head, passing through the eye; lips with dark bars. Lower parts white; all the scales finely dotted with dark brown. Young specimens have cross lines of white tubercles on the back; those on the tail all white.

Length of head and body 58 mm.; tail 60 mm.

Geographic range
 brookii
 Senegal, Togo, Angola, Cape Verde, Tanzania, Gambia, Democratic Republic of the Congo, Ghana, Eritrea, Ethiopia, Mali, Central African Republic, Ivory Coast, Cameroon, Sudan (Dagana + Goree Dondo/Cuanza River Atakpame).
 India (Himalaya), Bhutan, Thailand (HR 33: 322), Maldives, Malaysian Peninsula, Sri Lanka, Myanmar (= Burma) (Tsagain), Pakistan, Bangladesh, Nepal, Indonesia (Borneo).
 Mexico, Honduras, Haiti, Antilles, Cuba, Hispaniola, Puerto Rico, Port-Au-Prince, Trinidad, Colombia
 angulatus: Sudan, Uganda, south to Tanzania, west to Senegal. Zanzibar, Pemba Island.
 Type locality: West coast of Africa = Gabon [angulatus]
 leightoni: Venezuela (Zulia), Colombia
 Type locality: "Ada Foah (Guinea)" [= Ghana] [Hemidactylus guineensis PETERS 1868]

References

Further reading
Annandale N (1905). "Notes on some Oriental geckos in the Indian Museum, Calcutta, with Descriptions of new Forms". Annals and Magazine of Natural History, Seventh Series 15: 26-32.
Bauer AM, Günther R (1991). "An annotated type catalogue of the geckos (Reptilia: Gekkonidae) in the Zoological Museum, Berlin". Mitteilungen aus dem Zoologischen Museum in Berlin 67: 279-310.
Bauer AM, Pauwels OSG, Sumontha M (2002). "Hemidactylus brookii brookii, distribution". Herpetological Review 33: 322.
Das I (2006). A Photographic Guide to Snakes and other Reptiles of Borneo. Sanibel Island, Florida: Ralph Curtis Books. 144 pp. . (Hemidactylus brookii, p. 101).
Gleadow F (1887). "Description of a new lizard from the Dangs". Journal of the Bombay Natural History Society 2: 49-51.
Gray JE (1845). Catalogue of the Specimens of Lizards in the Collection of the British Museum. London: Trustees of the British Museum. (Edward Newman, printer). xxviii + 289 pp. (Hemidactylus brookii, new species, p. 153).
Mitchell JC, Zug GR (1988). "Ecological observations on the gecko Hemidactylus brookii in Nepal". Amphibia-Reptilia 9: 405-413.
Powell R, Maxey SA (1990). "Hemidactylus brookii ". Catalogue of American Amphibians and Reptiles. No. 493.

External links
 

Hemidactylus
Fauna of Southeast Asia
Reptiles of Asia
Reptiles of Pakistan
Reptiles of Thailand
Reptiles of West Africa
Reptiles described in 1845
Taxa named by John Edward Gray
Vertebrates of Cape Verde
Reptiles of Borneo